In category theory, a branch of abstract mathematics, an equivalence of categories is a relation between two categories that establishes that these categories are "essentially the same". There are numerous examples of categorical equivalences from many areas of mathematics. Establishing an equivalence involves demonstrating strong similarities between the mathematical structures concerned. In some cases, these structures may appear to be unrelated at a superficial or intuitive level, making the notion fairly powerful: it creates the opportunity to "translate" theorems between different kinds of mathematical structures, knowing that the essential meaning of those theorems is preserved under the translation.

If a category is equivalent to the opposite (or dual) of another category then one speaks of
a duality of categories, and says that the two categories are dually equivalent.

An equivalence of categories consists of a functor between the involved categories, which is required to have an "inverse" functor. However, in contrast to the situation common for isomorphisms in an algebraic setting, the composite of the functor and its "inverse" is not necessarily the identity mapping. Instead it is sufficient that each object be naturally isomorphic to its image under this composition. Thus one may describe the functors as being "inverse up to isomorphism". There is indeed a concept of isomorphism of categories where a strict form of inverse functor is required, but this is of much less practical use than the equivalence concept.

Definition
Formally, given two categories C and D, an equivalence of categories consists of a functor F : C → D, a functor G : D → C, and two natural isomorphisms ε: FG→ID and η : IC→GF. Here FG: D→D and GF: C→C denote the respective compositions of F and G, and IC: C→C and ID: D→D denote the identity functors on C and D, assigning each object and morphism to itself. If F and G are contravariant functors one speaks of a duality of categories instead.

One often does not specify all the above data. For instance, we say that the categories C and D are equivalent (respectively dually equivalent) if there exists an equivalence (respectively duality) between them. Furthermore, we say that F "is" an equivalence of categories if an inverse functor G and natural isomorphisms as above exist. Note however that knowledge of F is usually not enough to reconstruct G and the natural isomorphisms: there may be many choices (see example below).

Alternative characterizations
A functor F : C → D yields an equivalence of categories if and only if it is simultaneously:
 full, i.e. for any two objects c1 and c2 of C, the map HomC(c1,c2) → HomD(Fc1,Fc2) induced by F is surjective;
 faithful, i.e. for any two objects c1 and c2 of C, the map HomC(c1,c2) → HomD(Fc1,Fc2) induced by F is injective; and
 essentially surjective (dense), i.e. each object d in D is isomorphic to an object of the form Fc, for c in C.
This is a quite useful and commonly applied criterion, because one does not have to explicitly construct the "inverse" G and the natural isomorphisms between FG, GF and the identity functors. On the other hand, though the above properties guarantee the existence of a categorical equivalence (given a sufficiently strong version of the axiom of choice in the underlying set theory), the missing data is not completely specified, and often there are many choices. It is a good idea to specify the missing constructions explicitly whenever possible.
Due to this circumstance, a functor with these properties is sometimes called a weak equivalence of categories. (Unfortunately this conflicts with terminology from homotopy type theory.)

When adjoint functors  are not both full and faithful, then we may view their adjointness relation as expressing a "weaker form of equivalence" of categories. Assuming that the natural transformations for the adjunctions are given, all of these formulations allow for an explicit construction of the necessary data, and no choice principles are needed. The key property that one has to prove here is that the counit of an adjunction is an isomorphism if and only if the right adjoint is a full and faithful functor.

Examples
 By contrast, the category  with a single object and a single morphism is not equivalent to the category  with two objects and only two identity morphisms.
 Consider a category  with one object , and two morphisms . Of course,  is equivalent to itself, which can be shown by taking  in place of the required natural isomorphisms between the functor  and itself. Hence, given the information that the identity functors form an equivalence of categories, in this example one still can choose between two natural isomorphisms for each direction.
 The category of sets and partial functions is equivalent to but not isomorphic with the category of pointed sets and point-preserving maps.
 Consider the category  of finite-dimensional real vector spaces, and the category  of all real matrices (the latter category is explained in the article on additive categories).
 One of the central themes of algebraic geometry is the duality of the category of affine schemes and the category of commutative rings.  The functor  associates to every commutative ring its spectrum, the scheme defined by the prime ideals of the ring.  Its adjoint  associates to every affine scheme its ring of global sections.
 In functional analysis the category of commutative C*-algebras with identity is contravariantly equivalent to the category of compact Hausdorff spaces. This is the Gelfand representation.
 In lattice theory, there are a number of dualities, based on representation theorems that connect certain classes of lattices to classes of topological spaces. Probably the most well-known theorem of this kind is Stone's representation theorem for Boolean algebras, which is a special instance within the general scheme of Stone duality. Conversely, for any topology the clopen (i.e. closed and open) subsets yield a Boolean algebra. One obtains a duality between the category of Boolean algebras (with their homomorphisms) and Stone spaces (with continuous mappings). Another case of Stone duality is Birkhoff's representation theorem stating a duality between finite partial orders and finite distributive lattices.
 In pointless topology the category of spatial locales is known to be equivalent to the dual of the category of sober spaces.
 For two rings R and S, the product category R-Mod×S-Mod is equivalent to (R×S)-Mod.
 Any category is equivalent to its skeleton.

Properties
As a rule of thumb, an equivalence of categories preserves all "categorical" concepts and properties. If F : C → D is an equivalence, then the following statements are all true:
 the object c of C is an initial object (or terminal object, or zero object), if and only if Fc is an initial object (or terminal object, or zero object) of D
 the morphism α in C is a monomorphism (or epimorphism, or isomorphism), if and only if Fα is a monomorphism (or epimorphism, or isomorphism) in D.
 the functor H : I → C has limit (or colimit) l if and only if the functor FH : I → D has limit (or colimit) Fl. This can be applied to equalizers, products and coproducts among others. Applying it to kernels and cokernels, we see that the equivalence F is an exact functor.
 C is a cartesian closed category (or a topos) if and only if D is cartesian closed (or a topos).

Dualities "turn all concepts around": they turn initial objects into terminal objects, monomorphisms into epimorphisms, kernels into cokernels, limits into colimits etc.

If F : C → D is an equivalence of categories, and G1 and G2 are two inverses of F, then G1 and G2 are naturally isomorphic.

If F : C → D is an equivalence of categories, and if C is a preadditive category (or additive category, or abelian category), then D may be turned into a preadditive category (or additive category, or abelian category) in such a way that F becomes an additive functor. On the other hand, any equivalence between additive categories is necessarily additive. (Note that the latter statement is not true for equivalences between preadditive categories.)

An auto-equivalence of a category C is an equivalence F : C → C. The auto-equivalences of C form a group under composition if we consider two auto-equivalences that are naturally isomorphic to be identical. This group captures the essential "symmetries" of C. (One caveat: if C is not a small category, then the auto-equivalences of C may form a proper class rather than a set.)

See also 
 Equivalent definitions of mathematical structures

References

 

Adjoint functors
Category theory
Equivalence (mathematics)